Scott Geddes (born 18 October 1980) is an Australian former professional rugby league footballer who last played for the South Sydney Rabbitohs in the National Rugby League. He played as a prop forward.

Education
Geddes attended renowned rugby league school Fairfield Patrician Brothers.

Rugby League
Geddes made his first grade debut in round 2 of the 2002 NRL season against the Canberra Raiders.  Along with Luke Stuart, they were the first players to sign with the club when they were re-instated in the NRL.

Geddes played for Souths during a tough period for the club when they finished last in 2003, 2004 and 2006.  In 2007, he made 11 appearances as Souths reached the finals for the first time since 1989.

Geddes was a dominant force on the field. He was a large part of the team's successes in 2009 although the club narrowly missed the finals. He scored the winning try with just 4 seconds to go against the Cronulla-Sutherland Sharks in round 26 2009 at Shark Park.  Geddes received many accolades from the club during his career, including 'Clubman of the Year 2009'.

Geddes final game for South Sydney in the top grade came in round 16 of the 2012 NRL season against the Brisbane Broncos at Suncorp Stadium.

Injuries
Throughout his career Geddes battled many injuries, limiting his game time, including ruptured ACLs in 2003 and 2010 — his season ending knee injury in round 13 of 2010 was the first of the many injuries sustained by South Sydney that contributed to the team's poor performance that season — a torn Achilles tendon in 2011, and a ruptured right biceps muscle early in the 2012 season (he chose to continue playing, rather than have surgery during the season).

Retirement
During the 2012 NRL season, Geddes announced that he would retire at the end of the year as a one-club man.

After football
Specializing in providing personal training and group fitness classes at Maroubra since 2009, he is currently the director and head coach at First Grade Fitness in McKeon Street, Maroubra Beach, where he provides gymnasium facilities, and conducts group and personal training as well as corporate and athletic development programmes.

Footnotes

References 
  Ritchie, Dean, "Scott Geddes, Luke Stuart are Bookends of Stormy Era", The (Brisbane) Courier-Mail, 14 November 2010.
 Player Watch: Scott Geddes, nrl.com, 26 April 2012.
 Gaskin, Lee, "NRL players prove they're not all brawn", The Sydney Morning Herald, 8 August 2012.
 Heroes to Legends: Scott Geddes, nrl.com, 26 August 2012.
 Gabor, M., "Geddes wants players to plan for the future", nrl.com, 13 March 2016.
 Burnham, S., "PREMIUM: Catching Up With ... Scott Geddes", rabbitohs.com.au, 16 August 2016.

External links
 First Grade Fitness.
 Rugby League Project: Scott Geddes: Career Stats & Summary.

Australian rugby league players
South Sydney Rabbitohs players
North Sydney Bears NSW Cup players
Rugby league props
Rugby league players from Sydney
Living people
1980 births